Hongqiying East railway station is a railway station of Harbin–Qiqihar Intercity Railway and located in Heilongjiang, China

Railway stations in Heilongjiang
Stations on the Harbin–Qiqihar Intercity Railway